Arenicola is a genus of capitellid annelid worm comprising the lugworms and black lugs.

References

Polychaetes